Prestesteinsvatnet is a lake in Luster Municipality in Vestland county, Norway, with a small part of the lake crossing over into the neighboring Lom Municipality in Innlandet county. It lies along the south side of the Sognefjellsvegen road, just to the north of the mountain Fannaråki and the Fannaråkbreen glacier. The lake sits just outside the borders of Jotunheimen National Park.

See also
List of lakes in Norway

References

Lakes of Innlandet
Lakes of Vestland
Luster, Norway
Lom, Norway